Max Jones may refer to:

Max Jones (journalist), British journalist
Max Jones (ice hockey), American professional ice hockey forward